Ganghwa may refer to:

 Ganghwa County, administrative region of South Korea
 Ganghwa Island, island in South Korea
 Battle of Ganghwa
 The Japanese Battle of Ganghwa
 Treaty of Ganghwa

See also
 Gochang, Hwasun and Ganghwa Dolmen Sites, South Korea